The 1925 Copa Ibarguren was the 13th. edition of this National cup of Argentina. It was played by the champions of both leagues, Primera División and Liga Rosarina de Football crowned during 1925.

Huracán (Primera División champion) faced Tiro Federal (Copa Nicasio Vila champion) in a match held in Huracán's venue, Estadio Tomás Adolfo Ducó, on September 9, 1926.

Huracán defeated Tiro Federal (which played its second final) with goals by Guillermo Stábile and Juan Pratto, winning its second Ibarguren trophy.

Qualified teams 

Note

Match details

References

i
1925 in Argentine football
1925 in South American football